Wapiti Ranger Station is the oldest United States Forest Service ranger station in the United States. The station is in Shoshone National Forest west of Cody, Wyoming, and has been used continuously since it was built in 1903.  On May 23, 1963, Wapiti Ranger Station was designated as a National Historic Landmark, and placed on the National Register of Historic Places on October 15, 1966.

Description and history
The original 1903 building now stands amid a cluster of more modern Forest Service buildings, from which it is set off by a rail fence. It is a single-story log structure, with a low-pitch gabled roof. Modern extensions to the rear give the building a U shape, and its interior has been modernized, as it continues to serve an active role in forest management.

Shoshone National Forest was the first national forest to be created in the United States, in 1891.  The forest was enlarged over the following decade, to the point where it administratively required division.  The Wapiti Ranger Station was built in 1903 by W. H. Pierce, the first administrator of the forest's Shoshone division.  The station was the first forest service ranger station built with federal funding. Constructed with native forest timber, the structure is maintained regularly, with some recent improvements – such as replacing some rotting timber – implemented in 2005.

A location called Wapiti Station is featured in the 2016 game Firewatch, which is set in the Shoshone National Forest. However, its depiction and location within the forest do not resemble Wapiti Ranger Station.

See also
List of National Historic Landmarks in Wyoming
National Register of Historic Places listings in Park County, Wyoming

References

External links

 Wapiti Ranger Station National Historic Landmark at the Wyoming State Historic Preservation Office

1903 establishments in Wyoming
Buildings and structures in Park County, Wyoming
Government buildings completed in 1903
National Historic Landmarks in Wyoming
National Register of Historic Places in Park County, Wyoming
Park buildings and structures on the National Register of Historic Places in Wyoming
Rustic architecture in Wyoming
Shoshone National Forest
United States Forest Service ranger stations